United States obscenity law deals with the regulation or suppression of what is considered obscenity. In the United States, discussion of obscenity typically relates to pornography, as well as issues of freedom of speech and of the press, otherwise protected by the First Amendment to the Constitution of the United States. Issues of obscenity arise at federal and state levels. The States have a direct interest in public morality and have responsibility in relation to criminal law matters, including the punishment for the production and sale of obscene materials. State laws operate only within the jurisdiction of each state, and there are wide differences in such laws. The federal government is involved in the issue indirectly, by making it an offense to distribute obscene pornographic material depicting children through the mail, to broadcast them, as well as in relation to importation of such materials.

Most obscenity cases in the United States in the past century have revolved around images and films, but there have also been many cases that dealt with textual works as well, a notable case being that of the 18th century novel Fanny Hill. Because censorship laws enacted to combat obscenity restrict the freedom of expression, crafting a legal definition of obscenity presents a civil liberties issue.

Legal issues and definitions

The sale and distribution of obscene materials had been prohibited in most American states since the early 19th century, and by federal law since 1873. Adoption of obscenity laws in the United States at the federal level in 1873 was largely due to the efforts of Anthony Comstock, who created and led the New York Society for the Suppression of Vice. Comstock's intense efforts led to the passage of an anti-obscenity statute known as the Comstock Act which made it a crime to distribute "obscene" material through the post. It also prohibited the use of the mail for distribution of birth control devices and information. Comstock was appointed postal inspector to enforce the new law. Twenty-four states passed similar prohibitions on materials distributed within the states. The law criminalized not only sexually explicit material, but also material dealing with birth control and abortion. However, the legislation did not define "obscenity", which was left to the courts to determine on a case by case basis.

In the United States, the suppression or limitation of what is defined as obscenity raises issues of rights to freedom of speech and of the press protected by the First Amendment to the Constitution of the United States. The Supreme Court has ruled that obscenity is not protected by the First Amendment, but that the courts still need to determine whether material in question in each case is obscene.

Legally, a distinction is made between socially permitted material and discussions that the public can access on the one hand and obscenity, access to which should be denied, on the other. There does exist a classification of those acceptable materials and discussions that the public should be allowed to engage in, and the access to that same permitted material—which in the areas of sexual materials ranges between the permitted areas of erotic art (which usually includes "classic nude forms" such as Michelangelo's David statue) and the generally less respected commercial pornography.  The legal distinction between artistic nudity and permitted commercial pornography (which includes sexual penetration) deemed "protected forms of speech", versus "obscene acts", which are illegal acts and separate from those permitted areas, is usually predicated on cultural factors.  However, no such specific objective distinction exists outside of legal decisions in federal court cases where a specific action is deemed to fit the classification of obscene and thus illegal. The difference between erotic art and (protected) commercial pornography, vs. that which is legally obscene (and thus not covered by 1st Amendment protection), appears to be subject to decisions within local US federal districts and contemporary moral standards.

Federal obscenity law in the U.S. is unusual in that there is no uniform national standard, and there is an explicit legal precedent (the Miller test, below) that allows that something which is legally obscene in one jurisdiction may not be in another. In effect, the First Amendment protections of free speech vary by location within the U.S., and over time. With the advent of Internet distribution of potentially obscene material, this question of jurisdiction and community standards has created significant controversy in the legal community. (See United States v. Thomas, 74 F.3d 701 (6th Cir. 1996))

Even at the federal level, there does not exist a specific listing of which exact acts are to be classified as obscene outside of the legally determined court cases.  Title 18, chapter 71 of the USC deals with obscenity, the workings out of the law described in this article, most notably the aforementioned Miller test.

The Citizen's Guide To U.S. Federal Law On Obscenity lists several relevant statutes in regards to obscenity and its qualifications.

Definition of obscenity
Although lower courts in the U.S. had used the Hicklin standard sporadically since 1868, it was not until 1879, when prominent federal judge Samuel Blatchford upheld the obscenity conviction of D. M. Bennett using the Hicklin test, that the constitutionality of the Comstock Law became firmly established.

In Rosen v. United States (1896), the Supreme Court adopted the same obscenity standard as had been articulated in a famous British case, Regina v. Hicklin, [1868] L. R. 3 Q. B. 360. The Hicklin test defined material as obscene if it tended "to deprave or corrupt those whose minds are open to such immoral influences, and into whose hands a publication of this sort may fall."

In the mid-1950s, the Supreme Court ruled in Roth v. United States,  that the Hicklin test was inappropriate. Instead, the new Roth test for obscenity was:

In 1964, in Jacobellis v. Ohio, Justice Potter Stewart in applying the Roth test pointed out that "community standards" applicable to an obscenity are national, not local standards. He found that the material in question is "utterly without redeeming social importance". In attempting to classify what material constituted exactly "what is obscene," he famously wrote, "I shall not today attempt further to define the kinds of material I understand to be embraced ... [b]ut I know it when I see it ..." In Memoirs v. Massachusetts (1966) (dealing with the banning of the book Fanny Hill) the Court applied the Roth-Jacobellis test to determine that though the other aspects of the test were clear, the censor could not prove that Fanny Hill had no redeeming social value.

In 1973, the Supreme Court in Miller v. California established the three-tiered Miller test to determine what was obscene (and thus not protected) versus what was merely erotic and thus protected by the First Amendment. Delivering the opinion of the court, Chief Justice Warren Burger wrote:

The Miller Test is the current U.S. judicial precedent for determining obscenity.

Past standards 

The following standards were once used by courts to determine obscenity. Each of them has been invalidated, overturned, or superseded by the Miller test.
 Wepplo test (1947): If material has a substantial tendency to deprave or corrupt its readers by inciting lascivious thoughts or arousing lustful desires. (People v. Wepplo, 78 Cal. App. 2d Supp. 959, 178 P.2d 853).
 Hicklin test (1868): the effect of isolated passages upon the most susceptible persons. (British common law, cited in Regina v. Hicklin, 1868. LR 3 QB 360 - overturned when Michigan tried to outlaw all printed matter that would 'corrupt the morals of youth' in Butler v. State of Michigan 352 U.S. 380 (1957)).

Under FCC rules and federal law, radio stations and over-the-air television channels cannot air obscene material at any time and cannot air indecent material between 6 a.m. and 10 p.m.: language or material that, in context, depicts or describes, in terms patently offensive as measured by contemporary community standards for the broadcast medium, sexual or excretory organs or activities.

Many historically important works have been described as obscene or prosecuted under obscenity laws, including the works of Charles Baudelaire, Lenny Bruce, William S. Burroughs, Allen Ginsberg, James Joyce, D. H. Lawrence, Henry Miller, Samuel Beckett, and the Marquis de Sade.

Other court cases on obscenity 
 FCC v. Pacifica (1978), better known as the landmark "seven dirty words" case. In the decision, the Court found that only "repetitive and frequent" use of the words at a time or place when a minor could hear them could be punished.
In State v. Henry (1987), the Oregon Supreme Court ruled that the Oregon state law that criminalized obscenity was an unconstitutional restriction of free speech under the free speech provision of the Oregon Constitution, with the ruling making Oregon the "first state in the nation to abolish the offense of obscenity."
In Reno v. ACLU (1997), the Supreme Court invalidated several indecency provisions in the 1996 Communications Decency Act applying to the Internet.

Application of test
In U.S. legal texts, the question of "obscenity" refers to the Miller test.  As articulated in several sections of 18 USC Chapter 71, the Supreme Court has ruled that it is constitutional to legally limit the sale, transport for personal use or other transmission of obscenity.  However, it has ruled unconstitutional the passing of law concerning personal possession of obscenity per se. Federal obscenity laws at present apply to inter-state and foreign obscenity issues such as distribution; intrastate issues are for the most part still governed by state law.  "Obscene articles ... are generally prohibited entry" to the United States by U.S. Customs and Border Protection.

At present, there are only two legally protected areas of explicit commercial pornography. The first is "mere nudity". In Jenkins v. Georgia, 418 U.S. 153 (1974), the film Carnal Knowledge was deemed not to be obscene under the constitutional standards announced by Miller.  As declared by the trial judge in Jenkins, "The film shows occasional nudity, but nudity alone does not render material obscene under Miller's standards."  This principle was upheld time and again in later cases, including Erznoznik v. City of Jacksonville FL, 422 U.S. 205 (1975), in which a Jacksonville city ordinance made it a punishable offense to show films containing nudity when the screen is visible from a public street or place.  The law was determined to be invalid as it was an infringement of First Amendment rights of the movie producer and theater owners.

The second protected area is single male-to-female vaginal-only penetration that does NOT show the actual ejaculation of semen (sometimes referred to as "soft-core" pornography) wherein the sexual act and its fulfillment (orgasm) are merely implied to happen rather than explicitly shown. In June 2006, the federal government brought a case against JM Productions of Chatsworth, California in order to classify commercial pornography that specifically shows actual semen being ejaculated as obscene.  The four films that were the subject of the case were entitled American Bukkake 13, Gag Factor 15, Gag Factor 18 and Filthy Things 6.  The case also included charges of distribution of obscene material (a criminal act under 18 USC § 1465 - "Transportation of obscene matters for sale or distribution") against Five Star DVD for the extra-state commercial distribution of the JM Productions films in question. At trial, the Department of Justice decided not to pursue the JM obscenity case any further. The jury found that Five Star Video LC and Five Star Video Outlet LC were guilty of violating "18 USC 1465 - Transportation of obscene matters for sale or distribution" for having shipped JM Productions' film Gag Factor 18.  However, the specific content that the jury deemed "obscene" was not stated.

Obscenity v. indecency

The differentiation between indecent and obscene material is a particularly difficult one, and a contentious First Amendment issue that has not fully been settled. Similarly, the level of offense (if any) generated by a profane word or phrase depends on region, context, and audience.

Non image-based obscenity cases in the United States

Obscene texts
While most of the obscenity cases in the United States in the past century have revolved around images and films, there have been many cases that dealt with textual works as well.

The classification of "obscene" and thus illegal for production and distribution has been judged on printed text-only stories starting with "Dunlop v. U.S., 165 U.S. 486 (1897)" which upheld a conviction for mailing and delivery of a newspaper called the 'Chicago Dispatch,' containing "obscene, lewd, lascivious, and indecent materials", which was later upheld in several cases. One of these was "A Book Named "John Cleland's Memoirs of a Woman of Pleasure" v. Attorney General of Com. of Massachusetts, 383 U.S. 413 (1966)" wherein the book Fanny Hill,  written by John Cleland c. 1760, was judged to be obscene in a proceeding that put the book itself on trial rather than its publisher. Another was "Kaplan v. California, 413 U.S. 115 (1973)" whereby the court most famously determined that "Obscene material in book form is not entitled to any First Amendment protection merely because it has no pictorial content."

However, the book was labeled "erotica" in the 1965 case (206 NE 2d 403) and there a division between erotica and obscenity was made—not all items with erotic content were automatically obscene. Further, the 1965 "John Cleland's 'Memoirs'" case added a further qualification for the proving of "obscenity"—the work in question had to inspire or exhibit "prurient" (that is, "shameful or morbid") interest.

In 1964, the U.S. Supreme Court, in Grove Press, Inc. v. Gerstein, cited Jacobellis v. Ohio (which was decided the same day) and overruled state court findings of obscenity against Henry Miller's Tropic of Cancer. A unauthorized "Medusa" edition of the novel was published in New York City in 1940 by Jacob Brussel; its title page claimed its place of publication to be Mexico.  Brussel was eventually sent to prison for three years for the edition, a copy of which is in the Library of Congress.

In 2005, the U.S. Department of Justice formed the Obscenity Prosecution Task Force in a push to prosecute obscenity cases. Red Rose Stories (www.red-rose-stories.com, now defunct), a site dedicated to text-only fantasy stories, became one of many sites targeted by the FBI for shutdown.  The government alleged that Red Rose Stories contained depictions of child rape.  The publisher pleaded guilty.

Obscene devices
Many U.S. states have had bans on the sale of sex toys, regulating them as obscene devices. For instance, the 1999 Law and Government of Alabama (Ala. Code. § 13A-12-200.1) made it "unlawful to produce, distribute or otherwise sell sexual devices that are marketed primarily for the stimulation of human genital organs." Alabama claimed that these products were obscene, and that there was "no fundamental right to purchase a product to use in pursuit of having an orgasm." The ACLU challenged the statute, which was overturned in 2002. A federal judge reinstated the law in 2004.  The matter was appealed to the US Supreme Court, who in 2007 refused to hear the case, thus the decision of the lower court is enforceable within the state of Alabama. In 2007, a federal appeals court upheld Alabama's law prohibiting the sale of sex toys. The law, the Anti-Obscenity Enforcement Act of 1998, was also upheld by the Supreme Court of Alabama on September 11, 2009.

But other states have seen their sex toy bans ruled unconstitutional in the courts.  In 2008 the United States Court of Appeals for the Fifth Circuit ruled a similar Texas statute violated the constitutional right to privacy that was recognized by the U.S. Supreme Court in the Lawrence v. Texas decision. That ruling leaves only Mississippi, Alabama, and Virginia with current bans on the sale of obscene devices. Alabama is the only state with a law specifically prohibiting the sale of sex toys.

Criticism 
Obscenity law has been criticized in the following areas::
 Federal law forbids obscenity in certain contexts (such as broadcast); however, the law does not define the term.
 The U.S. Supreme Court similarly has had difficulty defining the term. In Miller v. California, the court defers definition to two hypothetical entities, "contemporary community standards" and "hypothetical reasonable persons".
 The courts and the legislature have had similar problems defining the term.
 Arguments have been made that the term "obscenity" is not specifically defined by case law, and thus does not satisfy the Vagueness doctrine, which states that people must clearly be informed as to the prohibited behavior.
 Arguments have been made that determination of what is obscene (offensive) varies, and thus alleged violations of obscenity law are not actionable (actions require a right).
 Critics have argued that no actual injury occurs when a mere preference is violated, so alleged violations of obscenity law are not actionable (actions require an injury).
 Critics have argued that, given its unusual and problematic history, unclear meaning, and the poor reasoning offered by the majorities in Roth and Miller to explain or justify the doctrine, the Supreme Court was simply wrong on the issue and the doctrine should be wholly discarded.

In light of the recent en banc decision of the Third Circuit Court of Appeals, as brought by Judge Lancaster in the original US vs. Extreme Associates case, only the US Supreme Court is allowed to revise its earlier decision that established the Miller decision.

The US Supreme Court refused to hear, effectively rejecting, such modification in August 2006 when the same en banc decision by the Third Circuit was sent to the US Supreme Court for review. Thus the open ended conflicting notes above remain in effect for obscenity prosecutions.

Public funding/public places 
Congress passed a law in 1990 that required such organizations such as the National Endowment of the Arts (NEA) and National Association of Artists' Organizations (NAAO) to abide by general decency standards for the "diverse beliefs and values of the American public." in order to receive grant money.

In National Endowment for the Arts vs. Karen Finley, the Supreme Court upheld the law, noting that the conditions were acceptable in light of the conditions on funding, rather than being a direct regulation on speech.

Government owned exhibition spaces are available under the Supreme Court's "public forum" doctrine. This doctrine explains that citizens within the United States have access to display in such public places such as lobbies of public buildings, theatrical productions, etc.

Even with this law in place it is hard for artists who have addressed sexually explicit work in work because of complaints which are generally in the form of "inappropriate for children" or seen as a form of "sexual harassment." Therefore, the arts works are removed and at times there are official "no nudity" policies that are put in place.

When these decisions are taken to court on account of free expression, the venues are often looked at to see if they are an actual "designated public forum." If they are, then public officials have violated the First Amendment rights of the individuals. The other side is if the court finds that there is "no designated public forum" in that venue, and thus government officials have the right to exclude and or censor the work.

Additional restrictions on sexual expression 

In the Miller decision the use of the words "contemporary community standards" typically means that the law evolves along with social mores and norms. This has been shown throughout the expansion of the pornography industry along with commercial pornography by people such as amateurs and publishers of personal websites on the World Wide Web. Indirect government control such as restrictive zoning of adult video stores and nude dancing were put in place because general obscenity convictions were harder to come by, but First Amendment case law allows reasonable time, place, and manner restrictions. Similarly a set of rules was put in place in Indiana to control erotic dancing, where legal, so that all dancers must either wear "pasties" or "g-strings" as shown in the 1991 case of Barnes v. Glen Theatre.

State laws 
The laws on pornography are regulated by the state, meaning that there is not a national law for pornography. Many states have restrictions on buying books and magazines of pornography. Between 1995 and 2002, almost half of the states were considering bills to control internet pornography, and more than a quarter of states enacted such laws. In many states, other laws controlling access to pornography exist, such as exposing minors to indecent material. However, the federal courts, in American Bookseller's Association v. Hudnut, have struck down anti-pornography laws as unconstitutional on first-amendment basis, because the restrictions at issue were based on viewpoint, and the state could not demonstrate enough harm to successfully overcome the traditional first-amendment jurisprudence.

Censorship in schools, universities, and libraries 
Schools, universities, and libraries receive government funds for many purposes, and some of these funds go to censorship of obscenity in these institutions. There are a few different ways in which this is done. One way is by not carrying pornographic or what the government deems obscene material in these places; another is for these places to purchase software that filters the internet activity on campus. An example is the federal Children's Internet Protection Act (CIPA). This mandates that all schools and libraries receiving federal aid for internet connections install a "technology protection measure" (filter) on all computers, whether used by children or adults. There are some states that have passed laws mandating censorship in schools, universities, and libraries even if they are not receiving government aid that would fund censorship in these institutions. These include Arizona, Kentucky, Michigan, Minnesota, South Carolina, and Tennessee. Twenty more states were considering such legislation in 2001–2002.

Child pornography 

Child pornography refers to images or films (also known as child abuse images) and in some cases outside of the United States, writings depicting sexually explicit activities involving a child; as such, child pornography is a record of child sexual abuse. Abuse of the child occurs during the sexual acts which are recorded in the production of child pornography, and several professors of psychology state that memories of the abuse are maintained as long as visual records exist, are accessed, and are "exploited perversely."

Child pornography is widely considered extremely obscene; however, the Supreme Court case New York v Ferber established that such material does not have to be found legally obscene to be prohibited, and offences relating to child pornography are separate from obscenity.

Censorship of film 
Film censorship in the United States was recognized as constitutional without limits by the 1915 U.S. Supreme Court decision Mutual Film Corp. v. Industrial Commission of Ohio.  This was overturned by the 1952 decision Joseph Burstyn, Inc. v. Wilson, restricting regulation only to "obscene" films. The 1965 case Freedman v. Maryland ruled that prior restraint of film exhibition without a court order was unconstitutional, leading to the end of most state and local film censorship boards. Current laws which can be enforced after the fact are limited by the definition of "obscene" in the 1973 U.S. Supreme Court decision Miller v. California.

The voluntary Motion Picture Association film rating system was adopted in 1968, functioning mostly to prevent children of various ages from seeing certain films at participating theaters. This has sometimes lead to self-censorship of certain sexual content among participating filmmakers wishing to avoid an X, R, or PG-13 rating that would restrict the size of the potential audience.

The most notable films given an "X" rating were Deep Throat (1972) and The Devil in Miss Jones (1973). These films show explicit, non-simulated, penetrative sex that was presented as part of a reasonable plot with respectable production values. Some state authorities issued injunctions against such films to protect "local community standards"; in New York the print of Deep Throat was seized mid-run, and the film's exhibitors were found guilty of promoting obscenity. This Film Is Not Yet Rated is a 2006 film which discusses disparities the filmmaker sees in ratings and feedback: between Hollywood and independent films, between homosexual and heterosexual sexual situations, between male and female sexual depictions, and between violence and sexual content. They found that films have also been further censored than their heterosexual, male, white counterparts due to gay sex (even if implied), African American sex, or female pleasure as opposed to male pleasure.

Possession of obscene material
In 1969, the Supreme Court held in Stanley v. Georgia that State laws making mere private possession of obscene material a crime are invalid, at least in the absence of an intention to sell, expose or circulate the material.

See also

 Censorship in the United States
 Indecent exposure in the United States
 Legality of pornography in the United States
 Anti-Obscenity Enforcement Act (Alabama)
 Texas obscenity statute
 Hate speech in the United States

References

Further reading
  - Written on June 19, 2009; posted June 22 that year

Obscenity law
Sexuality and society
Censorship in the United States